Hilbert's problems are 23 problems in mathematics published by German mathematician David Hilbert in 1900. They were all unsolved at the time, and several proved to be very influential for 20th-century mathematics. Hilbert presented ten of the problems (1, 2, 6, 7, 8, 13, 16, 19, 21, and 22) at the Paris conference of the International Congress of Mathematicians, speaking on August 8 at the Sorbonne. The complete list of 23 problems was published later, in English translation in 1902 by Mary Frances Winston Newson in the Bulletin of the American Mathematical Society.

Nature and influence of the problems
Hilbert's problems ranged greatly in topic and precision.  Some of them, like the 3rd problem, which was the first to be solved, or the 8th problem (the Riemann hypothesis), which still remains unresolved, were presented precisely enough to enable a clear affirmative or negative answer. For other problems, such as the 5th, experts have traditionally agreed on a single interpretation, and a solution to the accepted interpretation has been given, but closely related unsolved problems exist.  Some of Hilbert's statements were not precise enough to specify a particular problem, but were suggestive enough that certain problems of contemporary nature seem to apply; for example, most modern number theorists would probably see the 9th problem as referring to the conjectural Langlands correspondence on representations of the absolute Galois group of a number field.  Still other problems, such as the 11th and the 16th, concern what are now flourishing mathematical subdisciplines, like the theories of quadratic forms and real algebraic curves.

There are two problems that are not only unresolved but may in fact be unresolvable by modern standards. The 6th problem concerns the axiomatization of physics, a goal that 20th-century developments seem to render both more remote and less important than in Hilbert's time.  Also, the 4th problem concerns the foundations of geometry, in a manner that is now generally judged to be too vague to enable a definitive answer.

The other 21 problems have all received significant attention, and late into the 20th century work on these problems was still considered to be of the greatest importance.  Paul Cohen received the Fields Medal in 1966 for his work on the first problem, and the negative solution of the tenth problem in 1970 by Yuri Matiyasevich (completing work by Julia Robinson, Hilary Putnam, and Martin Davis) generated similar acclaim. Aspects of these problems are still of great interest today.

Ignorabimus
Following Gottlob Frege and Bertrand Russell, Hilbert sought to define mathematics logically using the method of formal systems, i.e., finitistic proofs from an agreed-upon set of axioms. One of the main goals of Hilbert's program was a finitistic proof of the consistency of the axioms of arithmetic: that is his second problem.

However, Gödel's second incompleteness theorem gives a precise sense in which such a finitistic proof of the consistency of arithmetic is provably impossible.  Hilbert lived for 12 years after Kurt Gödel published his theorem, but does not seem to have written any formal response to Gödel's work.

Hilbert's tenth problem does not ask whether there exists an algorithm for deciding the solvability of Diophantine equations, but rather asks for the construction of such an algorithm: "to devise a process according to which it can be determined in a finite number of operations whether the equation is solvable in rational integers". That this problem was solved by showing that there cannot be any such algorithm contradicted Hilbert's philosophy of mathematics.

In discussing his opinion that every mathematical problem should have a solution, Hilbert allows for the possibility that the solution could be a proof that the original problem is impossible. He stated that the point is to know one way or the other what the solution is, and he believed that we always can know this, that in mathematics there is not any "ignorabimus" (statement whose truth can never be known).  It seems unclear whether he would have regarded the solution of the tenth problem as an instance of ignorabimus: what is proved not to exist is not the integer solution, but (in a certain sense) the ability to discern in a specific way whether a solution exists.

On the other hand, the status of the first and second problems is even more complicated: there is no clear mathematical consensus as to whether the results of Gödel (in the case of the second problem), or Gödel and Cohen (in the case of the first problem) give definitive negative solutions or not, since these solutions apply to a certain formalization of the problems, which is not necessarily the only possible one.

The 24th problem

Hilbert originally included 24 problems on his list, but decided against including one of them in the published list. The "24th problem" (in proof theory, on a criterion for simplicity and general methods) was rediscovered in Hilbert's original manuscript notes by German historian Rüdiger Thiele in 2000.

Sequels
Since 1900, mathematicians and mathematical organizations have announced problem lists, but, with few exceptions, these have not had nearly as much influence nor generated as much work as Hilbert's problems.

One exception consists of three conjectures made by André Weil in the late 1940s (the Weil conjectures). In the fields of algebraic geometry, number theory and the links between the two, the Weil conjectures were very important. The first of these was proved by Bernard Dwork; a completely different proof of the first two, via ℓ-adic cohomology, was given by Alexander Grothendieck. The last and deepest of the Weil conjectures (an analogue of the Riemann hypothesis) was proved by Pierre Deligne. Both Grothendieck and Deligne were awarded the Fields medal. However, the Weil conjectures were, in their scope, more like a single Hilbert problem, and Weil never intended them as a programme for all mathematics. This is somewhat ironic, since arguably Weil was the mathematician of the 1940s and 1950s who best played the Hilbert role, being conversant with nearly all areas of (theoretical) mathematics and having figured importantly in the development of many of them.

Paul Erdős posed hundreds, if not thousands, of mathematical problems, many of them profound. Erdős often offered monetary rewards; the size of the reward depended on the perceived difficulty of the problem.

The end of the millennium, which was also the centennial of Hilbert's announcement of his problems, provided a natural occasion to propose "a new set of Hilbert problems". Several mathematicians accepted the challenge, notably Fields Medalist Steve Smale, who responded to a request by Vladimir Arnold to propose a list of 18 problems.

At least in the mainstream media, the de facto 21st century analogue of Hilbert's problems is the list of seven Millennium Prize Problems chosen during 2000 by the Clay Mathematics Institute. Unlike the Hilbert problems, where the primary award was the admiration of Hilbert in particular and mathematicians in general, each prize problem includes a million-dollar bounty. As with the Hilbert problems, one of the prize problems (the Poincaré conjecture) was solved relatively soon after the problems were announced.

The Riemann hypothesis is noteworthy for its appearance on the list of Hilbert problems, Smale's list, the list of Millennium Prize Problems, and even the Weil conjectures, in its geometric guise. Although it has been attacked by major mathematicians of our day, many experts believe that it will still be part of unsolved problems lists for many centuries. Hilbert himself declared: "If I were to awaken after having slept for a thousand years, my first question would be: Has the Riemann hypothesis been proved?"

In 2008, DARPA announced its own list of 23 problems that it hoped could lead to major mathematical breakthroughs, "thereby strengthening the scientific and technological capabilities of the DoD".

Summary
Of the cleanly formulated Hilbert problems, problems 3, 7, 10, 14, 17, 18, 19, and 20 have resolutions that are accepted by consensus of the mathematical community. On the other hand, problems 1, 2, 5, 6, 9, 11, 15, 21, and 22 have solutions that have partial acceptance, but there exists some controversy as to whether they resolve the problems.

That leaves 8 (the Riemann hypothesis), 12, 13 and 16 unresolved, and 4 and 23 as too vague to ever be described as solved. The withdrawn 24 would also be in this class. Number 6 is considered a problem in physics rather than in mathematics.

Table of problems
Hilbert's 23 problems are (for details on the solutions and references, see the detailed articles that are linked to in the first column):

See also
 Landau's problems
 Millennium Prize Problems

Notes

References

Further reading 

 
 
 
 A wealth of information relevant to Hilbert's "program" and Gödel's impact on the Second Question, the impact of Arend Heyting's and Brouwer's Intuitionism on Hilbert's philosophy.
  A collection of survey essays by experts devoted to each of the 23 problems emphasizing current developments.
 An account at the undergraduate level by the mathematician who completed the solution of the problem.

External links